Polar Geography is a quarterly peer-reviewed academic journal covering research on the physical and human aspects of the Polar regions of Earth. It is published by Taylor & Francis and was established in 1977. From 1980 to 1994 it was known as Polar Geography and Geology.

History 

The journal was established in 1977 with the financial support of the National Science Foundation and in cooperation with the American Geographical Society "in an effort to fill part of the gap in the broad area of physical and human geography of the Arctic and Antarctic".

Founders included Theodore Shabad (Columbia University), who also became the journal's first editor-in-chief for 11 years, until his death in 1987, and Melvin G. Marcus (Arizona State University).

Originally the journal was published by Scripta Technica Inc. and later by Bellwether Publishing. It was acquired by Taylor & Francis in 2007. At its inception the journal was named Polar Geography, changed three years afterwards, in 1980, to Polar Geography and Geology. In 1995 the journal's name was changed back to the original one.

The journal's aim was to make important Soviet, Japanese, and West European research on the polar regions available in English. Subsequently, the journal's focus shifted to the north circumpolar region with emphasis on the Russian Arctic, publishing articles dealing with human as well as physical dimensions of Arctic and Subarctic environments.

Editors-in-chief 
The following persons have been editor-in-chief:

Abstracting and indexing 
The journal is abstracted and indexed in ProQuest.

References

External links 
 

Arctic research
Publications established in 1977
English-language journals
Geography journals
Taylor & Francis academic journals
Quarterly journals